Heart Burns is the debut solo extended play by American singer-songwriter Laura Jane Grace, released under her birth name. It was released October 28, 2008 on Sire Records.

Track listing

Bonus tracks

Personnel
 Laura Jane Grace - lead and backing vocals, lead and rhythm guitar, bass guitar, drums
 Chuck Ragan – background vocals and harmonica on "Anna Is a Stool Pigeon"
 Matt Skiba – background vocals on "Amputations"
 Butch Vig – drums on "Anna Is a Stool Pigeon"

References

2008 debut EPs
Laura Jane Grace albums
Sire Records EPs
Folk rock albums by American artists
Folk rock EPs
Punk rock EPs